Witpoort is a town in Dr Kenneth Kaunda District Municipality in the North West province of South Africa.

References

Populated places in the Maquassi Hills Local Municipality